Paulia may refer to:
 Paulia (starfish), a genus of starfishes in the family Asterodiscididae
 Paulia (fungus), a genus of fungus